Virginia Galante Garrone (Vercelli, 20 January 1906 – Turin, 2 January 1998) was an Italian writer. She was the recipient of the inaugural Rapallo Carige Prize for L'ora del tempo in 1985.

References

1906 births
1998 deaths
Italian women novelists
20th-century Italian women writers
20th-century Italian novelists
People from Vercelli